Boxun is an aggregation website, which focuses on alleged political scandals in China. Boxun is partly backed by the China Free Press project, which is partially funded by the National Endowment for Democracy, a US-funded organization.

Founding and purpose
Boxun allows anyone to submit news to the website, which has resulted in a large number of articles remaining anonymous. Boxun was created by Meicun "Watson" Meng, who studied in the United States after working for two multinational companies in China. The Boxun servers are run from an office in North Carolina since 2000.

Critics
While the organization claims it is independently run and audited, critics – including German leftist magazine konkret – have suggested that it is simply a tool of U.S. foreign policy. Boxun.com is blocked in mainland China.

Defamation case
In 2012, Boxun falsely reported that actress Zhang Ziyi was paid $100 million to sleep with top Chinese officials. Zhang sued Boxun in a US court for defamation. In December 2013, Boxun settled the case after agreeing to pay an undisclosed amount to Zhang and issue a front-page apology.

References

American news websites